Cinetic Media is an American film financing and film distribution company that specializes in releasing independent films theatrically  and through  video on demand.

The company was founded by John Sloss.

References

Film distributors of the United States
Film production companies of the United States
International sales agents